BC Prometey, also known as Prometey Slobozhanske, is a Ukrainian basketball club based in Slobozhanske, previously based in Kamianske It played in the Ukrainian Basketball SuperLeague, the highest tier of basketball in Ukraine, from 2019 to 2022.

In the 2022–23 season team will play in Latvian-Estonian Basketball League, due to the ongoing war in Ukraine due to the 2022 Russian invasion.

History

The team was founded as Sports Club Prometey in September 2018, by Volodymyr Dubynsky and Pavlo Chukhno. The plans were to develop a basketball and volleyball team.

In 2018, Prometey joined the Ukrainian Higher League, the national second tier. On October 8, 2018, they played their first game against Zolotyi Vik, winning 86–80. Prometey went on to win the league title at the first attempt. Therefore, it was promoted to the SuperLeague for the 2019–20 season.

In its first SuperLeague season, Prometey was in third place before the season was shut down because of the COVID-19 pandemic. The following season, the club enrolled for the FIBA Europe Cup and made their European debut.

In 2021, Prometey won its first Ukrainian SuperLeague championship. The following season, Prometey made its debut at the European stage when it played in the Qualifying Rounds of the 2021–22 Basketball Champions League. In its debut season, it immediately qualified for the regular season and then advanced to the round of 16. Following the 2022 Russian invasion of Ukraine, Prometey withdrew from the competition and disbanded all teams of the club as club president Volodymyr Dubinskyi cited: "All money and resources should go to the army. Win first. Then everything.". All the club's teams were dissolved in March 2022.

On the 16th of June 2022 the club was included in the list of teams participating in the 2022–23 EuroCup Basketball. Prometey is expected to practice and play home games in Riga.

Honours
Ukrainian SuperLeague
Champions (1): 2020–21
Ukrainian Higher League
Winners (1): 2018–19

Season by season

Players

Current roster

Depth chart

Head coaches

Notable players

  Rashad Vaughn 1 season: 2020–21
  D. J. Stephens 1 season: 2020–21
  Denys Lukashov 2 seasons: 2019–21
  Oleksandr Lypovyy 1 season: 2020–21
  Viacheslav Petrov 1 season: 2020–21
  Oleksandr Belikov 1 season: 2020–21

References

External links
Official website

Basketball teams in Ukraine
Basketball teams established in 2018
Sport in Kamianske
2018 establishments in Ukraine